Dychtwald, Dichtwald is a surname. German 'dicht Wald' means 'dense forest'.  Notable people with the surname include:
 Maddy Dychtwald, American writer, wife of Ken
 Ken Dychtwald, American psychologist, husband of Maddy

Surnames of German origin